These 232 genera belong to the family Cixiidae, cixiid planthoppers. There are at least 2,500 described species in Cixiidae.

Cixiidae genera

 Achaebana Attie, Bourgoin & Bonfils, 2002 c g
 Achaemenes Stål, 1866 c g
 Adolendana Distant, 1917 c g
 Afroreptalus van Stalle, 1986 c g
 Aka de Laubenfels, 1936 i c g
 Amazobenna Penny, 1980 c g
 Andes Stål, 1866 c g
 Andixius Emeljanov & Hayashi, 2007 c g
 Anila Distant, 1906 c g
 Ankistrus Tsaur & Hsuan Stalle, 1991 c g
 Anoculiarus Dlabola, 1985 c g
 Antillixius Myers, 1928 c g
 Apartus Holzinger, 2002 c g
 Arosinus Emeljanov, 2007 c g
 Aselgeoides Distant, 1917 c g
 Asotocixius Kramer, 1983 c g
 Ateson Metcalf, 1938 g
 Atonurus Emeljanov, 1993 c g
 Atretus Emeljanov, 2007 c g
 Aubirestus Löcker & Larivière, 2006 c g
 Aulocorypha Berg, 1879 c g
 Autrimpus Szwedo, 2004 c g
 Bajauana Distant, 1907 c g
 Balticixius Lefebvre, Bourgoin & Nel, 2007 c g
 Balyadimetopia Löcker & Larivière, 2006 c g
 Bangoliarus  c g
 Barbonia Löcker & Larivière, 2006 c g
 Benna Walker, 1856 c g
 Bennarella Muir, 1930 c g
 Bennaria Melichar, 1914 c g
 Betacixius Matsumura, 1914 c g
 Bodecia Walker, 1868 c g
 Borbonomyndus Attié, Bourgoin & Bonfils, 2002 c g
 Borysthenes Stål, 1866 c g
 Bothriobaltia Szwedo, 2002 c g
 Bothriocera Burmeister, 1835 c g b
 Bothrioceretta Caldwell, 1950 c g
 Brixia Stål, 1856 c g
 Brixidia Haglund, 1899 c g
 Caffrocixius  c g
 Cajeta Stål, 1866 c g
 Calamister Kirkaldy, 1906 c g
 Candicarina Löcker & Larivière, 2006 c g
 Caneirona Distant, 1916 c g
 Canobenna  c g
 Caravella Emeljanov, 2007 c g
 Carolus Kirkaldy, 1906 c g
 Celebenna Hoch & Wessel, 2011 c g
 Cermada Emeljanov, 2000 c g
 Chathamaka Larivière, 1999 c g
 Chidea Emeljanov, 2000 c g
 Chlorodus  c g
 Cibrica Emeljanov, 2007 c g
 Cicerama Emeljanov, 2007 c g
 Cixiosoma Berg, 1879 c g
 Cixius Latreille, 1804 c g b
 Clarabenna  c g
 Colvanalia Muir, 1925 c g
 Confuga Fennah, 1975 c g
 Cordobenna  c g
 Cordoliarus Löcker, 2006 c g
 Corylonga Löcker & Fletcher, 2006 c g
 Cotyleceps Uhler, 1895 g
 Cretofennahia Martins-Neto & Szwedo, 2007 c g
 Cubana Uhler, 1895 c g
 Cubanella Fennah, 1948 c g
 Cyclobenna  c g
 Cyclopoliarus Fennah, 1945 c g
 Dentobenna  c g
 Diastrocixius Caldwell, 1944 c g
 Dilacreon Fennah, 1980 c g
 Dorialus van Stalle, 1986 c g
 Duilius Stal, 1858 c g
 Dysoliarus Fennah, 1949 c g
 Dystheatias Kirkaldy, 1907 c g
 Epoliarus Matsumura, 1910 c g
 Eucarpia Walker, 1857 c g
 Eumecurus Emeljanov, 1971 c g
 Eumyndus Synave, 1956 c g
 Euryphlepsia Muir, 1922 c g
 Ferricixius Hoch & Ferreira, 2012 c g
 Fipsianus Holzinger, 2009 c g
 Flachaemus van Stalle, 1989 c g
 Fletcherolus Löcker & Larivière, 2006 c g
 Fuscobenna  c g
 Gelastocaledonia Löcker & Larivière, 2006 c g
 Gelastocephalus Kirkaldy, 1906 c g
 †Glisachaemus Szwedo, 2007 c g
 Goniobenna  c g
 Gonophallus Tsaur & Hsuan Stalle, 1991 c g
 Gurrundus Löcker & Larivière, 2006 c g
 Guttala Löcker & Larivière, 2006 c g
 Haplaxius Fowler, 1904 c g b
 Hartliebia Löcker & Larivière, 2006 c g
 Helenolius van Stalle, 1986 c g
 Holgus Löcker & Larivière, 2006 c g
 Huttia Myers, 1924 c g
 Hyalesthes Signoret, 1865 c g
 Ibleocixius D'Urso & Grasso, 2009 c g
 Indolipa Emeljanov, 2001 c g
 Innobindus Jacobi, 1928 c g
 Iolania Kirkaldy, 1902 i c g
 Ithma Fennah, 1969 c g
 Jonabenna  c g
 Karebodopoides Szwedo, 2001 c g
 Kibofascius van Stalle, 1986 c g
 Kinabenna  c g
 Kirbyana Distant, 1906 c g
 Koroana Myers, 1924 c g
 Kotonisia Matsumura, 1938 c g
 Kulickamia Gebicki & Szwedo, 2000 c g
 Kuvera Distant, 1906 c g
 Lalobidius van Stalle, 1985 c g
 Larivierea Löcker & Fletcher, 2006 c g
 Leades Jacobi, 1928 c g
 Leptolamia Metcalf, 1936 c g
 Lipsia Löcker & Fletcher, 2006 c g
 Loisirella Holzinger, Holzinger & Egger, 2013 c g
 Macrocixius Matsumura, 1914 c g
 Madangabenna  c g
 Malpha Myers, 1924 c g
 Malukubenna  c g
 Manurevana Hoch, 2006 c g
 Meenocixius Attié, Bourgoin & Bonfils, 2002 c g
 Melandeva  c g
 Melanoclypeus Löcker & Fletcher, 2006 c g
 Melanoliarus Fennah, 1945 c g b
 Mesoliarus Matsumura, 1910 c g
 Metaplacha Emeljanov, 2000 c g
 Miclucha Emeljanov, 2001 c g
 Microledrida Fowler, 1904 c g b
 Minabenna  c g
 Mnaomaia Szwedo, Bourgoin & Lefebvre, 2006 c g
 Mnasthaia Szwedo, Bourgoin & Lefebvre, 2006 c g
 Mnemosyne Stål, 1866 c g
 Monomalpha Emeljanov, 2000 c g
 Monorachis Uhler, 1901 c g b
 Muirolonia Metcalf, 1936 c g
 Mundopa Distant, 1906 c g
 Mundopoides Fennah, 1987 g
 Myndodus Emeljanov, 1993 c g
 Myndus Stål, 1862 c g
 Nanocixius Wagner, 1939 c g
 Narravertus van Stalle, 1986 c g
 Negrobenna  c g
 Neocarpia Tsaur & Hsu, 2003 c g
 Neocixius Wagner, 1939 c g
 Nesochlamys Kirkaldy, 1907 c g
 Nesoliarus Kirkaldy, 1909 c g
 Nesomyndus Jacobi, 1917 c g
 Nivcentia Holzinger, 2004 c g
 Noabennarella Holzinger & Kunz, 2006 c g
 Norialsus van Stalle, 1986 c g
 Nothocharis Muir, 1925 c g
 Notocixius Fennah, 1965 c g
 Notolathrus Marino de Remes Lenicov, 1993 c g
 Novotarberus Löcker & Fletcher, 2006 c g
 Nymphocixia Van Duzee, 1923 c g b
 Nymphomyndus Emeljanov, 2007 c g
 Oecleopsis Emeljanov, 1971 c g
 Oecleus Stål, 1862 c g b
 Oeclixius Fennah, 1963 c g
 Oliarellus Emeljanov, 1971 c g
 Oliarissa Fennah, 1945 c g
 Oliaronus Ball, 1934 c g b
 Oliarus Stål, 1862 i c g
 Oligocixia Gebicki & Wegierek, 1993 c g
 Olipa Emeljanov, 2001 c g
 Oliparisca Emeljanov, 2001 c g
 Orphninus Emeljanov, 2000 c g
 Oteana Hoch, 2006 c g
 Ozoliarus Löcker, 2006 c g
 Pachyntheisa Fowler, 1904 c g
 Papuabenna  c g
 Parandes Muir, 1925 c g
 Parasemo Larivière, 1999 c g
 Payastylus Löcker & Fletcher, 2006 c g
 Peartolus van Stalle, 1986 c g
 Pentastira Kirschbaum, 1868 c g
 Pentastiridius Kirschbaum, 1868 c g b
 Perindus Emeljanov, 1989 c g
 Perkunus Szwedo & Stroinski, 2007 c g
 Phytocentor Fennah, 1980 c g
 Pinacites  c g
 Pintalia Stal, 1862 c g b
 Platycixius Van Duzee, 1914 c g b
 Plecophlebus  c g
 Proclytus Emeljanov, 2007 c g
 Prosops Buckton, 1893 c g
 Pseudoliarus Haupt, 1927 c g
 Pterolophus Emeljanov, 2013 c g
 Reptalus Emeljanov, 1971 c g
 Rhamphixius Fowler, 1900 c g
 Rhigedanus Emeljanov, 2000 c g
 Rhyobenna  c g
 Rokebia Löcker & Fletcher, 2006 c g
 Romabenna  c g
 Ronaldia Emeljanov, 2000 c g
 Sanghabenna  c g
 Sardocixius Holzinger, 2002 c g
 Schuerrera Löcker & Fletcher, 2006 c g
 Semicixius Tsaur & Hsuan Stalle, 1991 c g
 Semo Buchanan White, 1879 c g
 Setapius Dlabola, 1988 c g
 Silangobenna  c g
 Simplicixius Holzinger, 2002 c g
 Singabenna  c g
 Siniarus Emeljanov, 2007 c g
 Sinubenna  c g
 Solonaima Kirkaldy, 1906 c g
 Sphaerocixius Wagner, 1939 c g
 Stalisyne Szwedo, Bourgoin & Lefebvre, 2006 c g
 Stegocixius Kramer, 1983 c g
 Stenophlepsia Muir, 1922 c g
 Striabenna  c g
 Suriola Emeljanov, 1993 c g
 Tachycixius Wagner, 1939 c g
 Taomma Emeljanov, 2007 c g
 Thaumatobenna  c g
 Tiriteana Myers, 1924 c g
 Torrebenna  c g
 Trigonocranus Fieber, 1875 c g
 Trirhacus Fieber, 1876 c g
 Tsauria Koçak & Kemal, 2009 c g
 Typhlobrixia Synave, 1953 c g
 Undarana Hoch & Howarth, 1989 c g
 Urvillea Kirkaldy, 1907 c g
 Volcanalia Distant, 1917 c g
 Wernindia Löcker & Fletcher, 2006 c g
 Yanganaka Löcker, 2015 c g
 Yarnikada Löcker & Fletcher, 2006 c g
 Zeoliarus Larivière & Fletcher, 2008 c g

Data sources: i = ITIS, c = Catalogue of Life, g = GBIF, b = Bugguide.net

References

Cixiidae